Qanat-e Malek (also Romanized as Qanāt-e Malek and Ghanat-e Malek), also known as Kahnau Malik or Kahnū Malek, is a village in Javaran Rural District, Hanza District, Rabor County, Kerman Province, Iran. At the 2006 census, its population was 338, in 77 families.

Qasem Soleimani, an eminent Iranian military commander who was known by his assassination by Americans, was born in this village on 11 March 1957. He was a Lieutenant general in the Islamic Revolutionary Guard Corps from 1998 until his death, the commander of its Quds Force, a division primarily in charge of clandestine extraterritorial military operations.

Notable people
 Qasem Soleimani, a general in Islamic Revolutionary Guard Corps

References 

Populated places in Rabor County